The Miami Marathon Oil Company Service Station, at 331 S. Main St. in Miami, Oklahoma, was built in 1929.  It was listed on the National Register of Historic Places in 1995.

It is a one-story Classical Revival-style building built on the south side of historic Route 66.

References

National Register of Historic Places in Ottawa County, Oklahoma
Neoclassical architecture in Oklahoma
Commercial buildings completed in 1929
Gas stations on the National Register of Historic Places in Oklahoma
U.S. Route 66 in Oklahoma
Miami, Oklahoma
1929 establishments in Oklahoma
Marathon Oil